Mós is a civil parish in the municipality of Bragança, Portugal. The population in 2011 was 178, in an area of 11.62 km².

References

Parishes of Bragança, Portugal